Ludcinio Marengo (born 14 September 1991) is a Dutch professional footballer who plays as a winger. Besides the Netherlands, he has played in Norway and Bulgaria.

He formerly played for FC Volendam, ADO Den Haag, Go Ahead Eagles, Brann and Tsarsko Selo Sofia.

Personal life
Born in the Netherlands, Marengo is of Surinamese descent.

References

External links
 Voetbal International profile 

1991 births
Living people
Dutch sportspeople of Surinamese descent
Dutch footballers
Dutch expatriate footballers
Eredivisie players
Eerste Divisie players
Eliteserien players
First Professional Football League (Bulgaria) players
FC Volendam players
ADO Den Haag players
Go Ahead Eagles players
SK Brann players
FC Tsarsko Selo Sofia players
Expatriate footballers in Norway
Dutch expatriate sportspeople in Norway
Expatriate footballers in Bulgaria
Dutch expatriate sportspeople in Bulgaria
Association football midfielders
Footballers from Amsterdam